Gotthard Handrick (25 October 1908 – 30 May 1978) was a German Olympic athlete and German fighter pilot during the Spanish Civil War and World War II.

Career

Handrick was born on 25 October 1908 in Zittau, at the time in the Kingdom of Saxony as part of the German Empire. He won the gold medal in the modern pentathlon at the 1936 Summer Olympics in Berlin.

In July 1937, Handrick was appointed Gruppenkommandeur (group commander) of Jagdgruppe 88 (18 July 1937 – 10 September 1938). This unit fought in the Spanish Civil War where he claimed five aerial victories while flying for the Legion Condor, including a Polikarpov I-15 fighter on 9 September 1937 and an Polikarpov I-16 fighter on 18 May 1938. He was later awarded the Spanish Cross in Gold with Swords on 14 April 1939 for his service in the Spanish Civil War.

Handrick was then given command of I. Gruppe of Jagdgeschwader 132 "Schlageter" on 11 September 1938 after his return from Spain. This unit then became I. Gruppe of Jagdgeschwader 26 "Schlageter" on 1 May 1939 which he led until 23 June 1940. On 24 June 1940 command of JG 26 was handed over to Major Handrick, who passed command of I./JG 26 to Hauptmann Kurt Fischer. After he left JG 26, Handrick served with the Luftwaffenmission Rumänien (Luftwaffe Mission Romania) under the command of Generalleutnant (equivalent to major general) Wilhelm Speidel.

On 7 October, Handrick took over command of III. Gruppe of Jagdgeschwader 52 (JG 52—52nd Fighter Wing) from Hauptmann Alexander von Winterfeld who was transferred. He led this Gruppe until 23 June 1941. Command of the Gruppe was then given to Major Albert Blumensaat.

Wing commander
In June 1941, Handrick was transferred and became the Geschwaderkommodore (wing commander) of Jagdgeschwader 77 (JG 77—77th Fighter Wing). While serving on the Eastern Front he claimed a Mikoyan-Gurevich MiG-3 fighter on 29 September and a Petlyakov Pe-2 bomber on 22 October 1941.

During World War II he was a recipient of the German Cross in Gold on 17 October 1943. In March 1942, Oberstleutnant Handrick transferred to command Jagdgeschwader 5 (JG 5—5th Fighter Wing) in Norway and Northern Russia. From June 1943 to June 1944 he was Jagdfliegerführer Ostmark. Then as an Oberst, he became the commanding officer of 8. Jagd-Division in Austria, a position he held until the end of the war. After the war he worked in Hamburg as a representative of Daimler-Benz.

Awards
Spanish Cross in Gold with Swords (14 April 1939)
Iron Cross 2nd and 1st Class
German Cross in Gold on 17 October 1943 as Oberst in Jagdgeschwader 5

References

Citations

Bibliography

 
 
 
 
 
 
 
 
 
 
 
 
 
 

1908 births
1978 deaths
Modern pentathletes at the 1936 Summer Olympics
German male modern pentathletes
Olympic modern pentathletes of Germany
Olympic gold medalists for Germany
Olympic medalists in modern pentathlon
People from Zeitz
Spanish Civil War flying aces
German World War II flying aces
German military personnel of the Spanish Civil War
Luftwaffe pilots
Recipients of the Gold German Cross
People from the Province of Saxony
Condor Legion personnel
Medalists at the 1936 Summer Olympics
Sportspeople from Saxony-Anhalt